The 2006 Conference USA men's soccer tournament was the twelfth edition of the Conference USA Men's Soccer Tournament. The tournament decided the Conference USA champion and guaranteed representative into the 2006 NCAA Division I Men's Soccer Championship. The tournament was hosted by the University of Tulsa and the games were played at the Hurricane Soccer & Track Stadium.

Bracket

Schedule

Quarterfinals

Semifinals

Final

Statistics

Goalscorers

Awards

All-Tournament team
Barry Rice, Kentucky
Masumi Turnbull, Kentucky
Matt Wiler, Kentucky
Paulo da Silva, SMU
Bruno Guarda, SMU
Jay Needham, SMU
Matt Wideman, SMU
Eric Burkholder, Tulsa
Eric DeFreitas, Tulsa
Trey Gregory, UAB
Jerson Monteiro, UAB

References

External links
 

Conference USA Men's Soccer Tournament
Tournament
Conference USA Men's Soccer Tournament
Conference USA Men's Soccer Tournament